Capellades is a district of the Alvarado canton, in the Cartago province of Costa Rica.

Geography 
Capellades has an area of  km2 and an elevation of  metres.

Demographics 

For the 2011 census, Capellades had a population of  inhabitants.

Transportation

Road transportation 
The district is covered by the following road routes:
 National Route 10
 National Route 230
 National Route 417

References 

Districts of Cartago Province
Populated places in Cartago Province